Devon Collier (born January 20, 1991) is a Puerto Rican basketball player for the Capitanes de Arecibo in the Puerto Rican Baloncesto Superior Nacional (BSN). He played college basketball for Oregon State Beavers men's basketball team.

High school career
Collier attended St. Anthony High School, was a four star recruit and a consensus top 150 prospect rating 76th overall in Espn. In his freshman year, he averaged 17.0 points and 8.0 rebounds.

College career
Collier played for the Oregon State Beavers men's basketball team, In his freshman season, he aveerged 7 points, 4.4 rebounds and 0.7 assists per game. In his sophomore season, he averaged 13.1 points, 5.2 rebounds and 1.8 assists. In his junior year, he averaged 12.6 points, 6 rebounds and 1.6 assists per game. In July 2013, Collier was suspended indefinitely for violating team rules, though he only missed a game. In his senior year, he averaged 13.4 points, 5.6 rebounds and 1.5 assists per game.

Professional career
In 2014, he signed for the Puerto Rican side Caciques de Humacao where he averaged 8.7 points, 7.2 rebounds and 0.9 assists per game. In his second season at Caciques de Humacao, he averaged 13.7 points, 5.9 rebounds and 2.4 assists per game In the 2015–16 season, he moved to the Israeli side Hapoel Galil Elyon where he averaged 22.4 points, 8.3 rebounds and 3.4 assists per game, playing 12 games. In the 2016–17 season he moved to the Puerto Rican side Indios de Mayagüez where he averaged 12.9 points, 7.9 rebounds and 2 assists per game. In the 2017–18 season, he moved back to the Caciques de Humacao where he averaged 9.3 points, 7.3 rebounds and 2 assists per game playing three games before moving to the French team Poitiers Basket where he averaged 12.1 points, 5.4 rebounds and 2.1 assists per game. He moved to the Capitanes de Arecibo in the 2018–19 season, where he averaged 6.4 points, 4.3 rebounds and 1.1 assists per game.

National team career
Collier represented the Puerto Rican national basketball team at the 2019 FIBA Basketball World Cup where he averaged 5.8 points, 4 rebounds and 0.4 assists per game.

References

External links
RealGM profile
Oregon State Beavers bio

1991 births
Living people
American expatriate basketball people in France
American expatriate basketball people in Israel
Astros de Jalisco players
Basketball players from New York City
Caciques de Humacao players
Capitanes de Arecibo players
Indios de Mayagüez basketball players
Leñadores de Durango players
Leones de Ponce basketball players
Oregon State Beavers men's basketball players
Poitiers Basket 86 players
Power forwards (basketball)
Puerto Rican men's basketball players
Soles de Mexicali players
Sportspeople from the Bronx
Pan American Games medalists in basketball
Pan American Games silver medalists for Puerto Rico
Basketball players at the 2019 Pan American Games
Medalists at the 2019 Pan American Games